Aliabad-e Kavir (also Romanized as ‘Alīābād-e Kavīr; also known as ‘Alīābād) is a village in Sefiddasht Rural District, in the Central District of Aran va Bidgol County, Isfahan Province, Iran. At the 2006 census, its population was 1,330, in 339 families.

References 

Populated places in Aran va Bidgol County